William Bonham may refer to:

 William Bonham, High Sheriff of Wiltshire for 1514
 Sir William Bonham, High Sheriff of Essex in 1526
William Bonham (MP) (1513–1547 or later), MP for Maldon
 Bill Bonham (born 1948), American baseball player

See also
Bonham (disambiguation)